Aryapu (Rural)  is a village in the southern state of Karnataka, India. It is located in the Puttur taluk of Dakshina Kannada district in Karnataka.

Demographics
As of 2001 India census, Aryapu (Rural) had a population of 5547 with 2813 males and 2734 females.

See also
 Dakshina Kannada
 Districts of Karnataka

References

External links
 http://dk.nic.in/

Villages in Dakshina Kannada district